The 1948–49 season was Manchester City's 47th season of competitive football and 33rd season in the top division of English football. In addition to the First Division, the club competed in the FA Cup.

First Division

League table

Results summary

References

External links

Manchester City F.C. seasons